Andrea Fogli is an Italian interior and furniture designer based in Milan.

His office, Andrea Fogli Studio, is known for the originality of its hotels, restaurants and private houses projects.

Career
Amongst the most important projects are: Riviera Golf Resort & Spa (2004), Argentario Golf Resort & Spa  (2007), Mondial Resort & Spa (2008) and private houses in Milan and Paris.

Since 2006 he is designer and creative director for Italian furniture firm DOM Edizioni.

He is currently working on the new Excelsior Resort in Pesaro, Italy, a yacht in the Maldives Islands and private houses around Europe.

Andrea Fogli centres his work on perfect proportions, classical beauty with a certain twist, always trying to write a new screenplay for all the projects.

References

External links
 Andrea Fogli Studio Official Website
 LA REPUBBLICA Grandi guide, 2008-2009
 CASAVIVA, April 2008
 DNN, April 2008
 Argentario Golf Resort & Spa
 DOM Edizioni
 Riviera Golf Club Resort
 Andrea Fogli's AGRS in Wallpaper
 Fotos from Mondial Resort & Spa
 Newsweekly - Interni Magazine

Italian interior designers
Product designers
Living people
Italian industrial designers
Year of birth missing (living people)